Michael Leonard Ontkean (born 24 January 1946) is a retired Canadian actor. Born and raised in Vancouver, British Columbia, Ontkean relocated to the United States to attend the University of New Hampshire on a hockey scholarship before pursuing a career in acting in the early 1970s.

He initially came to prominence portraying Officer Willie Gillis on the crime drama series The Rookies from 1972 to 1974, followed by lead roles in the hockey sports comedy film Slap Shot (1977) and the romantic comedy Willie & Phil (1980). In 1982, he had a starring role opposite Harry Hamlin and Kate Jackson in the drama Making Love, in which he portrayed a married man who comes to terms with his homosexuality. Ontkean continued to appear in films, such as Clara's Heart (1988) and Postcards from the Edge (1990) before being cast as Sheriff Harry S. Truman on David Lynch's Twin Peaks (1990–1991), the role for which he is probably best known.

Early life
Ontkean was born and raised in Vancouver, British Columbia, the son of Muriel (née Cooper), an actress, and Leonard Ontkean, a boxer and actor. He was a child actor in Vancouver, appearing on the Canadian television series Hudson's Bay (1959). His family later relocated to Toronto, where he attended St. Michael's Choir School and Holy Rosary Catholic School before attending St. Michael's College School. He grew up playing hockey and he earned a hockey scholarship to the University of New Hampshire, a Division I program playing in the ECAC. In his three years on the varsity program, Ontkean scored 63 goals and 111 points in 85 games played. He led the team in goal scoring his junior year with 30 goals, and was second behind fellow Canadian Louis Frigon his senior year.

Career
Ontkean began in Hollywood by guest starring in The Partridge Family in 1971, and he was a television guest player on such shows as Ironside and Longstreet, but his break was in the ABC series The Rookies (1972–1976), in which he played Officer Willie Gillis for the first two seasons. He was replaced by actor, Bruce Fairbairn in The Rookies. Ontkean's hockey skill played a large role in his landing the role of Ned Braden in Slap Shot (1977), as he performed all of his on-ice shots himself. In 1979, he appeared in the first episode of Tales of the Unexpected.

Other early movie roles included Necromancy (1972) with Orson Welles; Voices (1979) with Amy Irving; Willie & Phil (1980) with Margot Kidder; The Blood of Others (1984); Kids Don't Tell (1985) with JoBeth Williams; The Right of the People (1986); The Allnighter and Maid to Order (both 1987) (the latter with Ally Sheedy); Clara's Heart (1988) with Whoopi Goldberg, and Bye Bye Blues (1989).

Making Love
Making Love (1982) is about a married man who discovers his homosexuality. Ontkean was not the director's first choice for the film: Arthur Hiller had previously approached Tom Berenger, Michael Douglas, Harrison Ford, William Hurt and Peter Strauss to play the lead, before finally approaching Ontkean. According to Hiller, the reaction of most actors was to tell him not to even consider them for the role. The film reunited Ontkean with Kate Jackson; the two had previously co-starred together in The Rookies. Many years later, Ontkean tried to prevent clips from the film from being included in The Celluloid Closet, a 1996 documentary about LGBT characters in film, but he was unsuccessful.

Twin Peaks
Ontkean appeared as Sheriff Harry S. Truman in David Lynch and Mark Frost's Twin Peaks (1990–1991). He filmed scenes for Twin Peaks: Fire Walk with Me but, like many others from the original TV series, his scenes were deleted from the final film.

After Twin Peaks
Ontkean subsequently appeared in many film and television productions including In Defense of a Married Man (1990); In a Child's Name (1991) with Valerie Bertinelli; Legacy of Lies (1992); Rapture and Vendetta II: The New Mafia (both 1993); Swann: A Mystery and The Stepford Husbands (both 1996); Summer of the Monkeys and A Chance of Snow (both 1998; the latter again with JoBeth Williams); Bear with Me (2000), and Mrs. Ashboro's Cat (2003).

Ontkean had a recurring role on Fox's short-lived series North Shore in 2004, and also appeared in the 2008 comedy TV show Sophie.

The Descendants and retirement
He had a supporting role in the 2011 film The Descendants, which was his last role to date before he decided to retire from acting. The movie was filmed in Hawaii, where he lives.

Ontkean was approached to reprise his role as Sheriff Truman for the 2017 revival of Twin Peaks. At first, Ontkean was reportedly excited about returning to the role, and enlisted Twin Peaks authority Brad Dukes to help him find the jacket which his character once wore on the show. Dukes located a suitable replica, bought it and sent it to Ontkean. However, in 2015, Ontkean dropped out of the Twin Peaks revival, for reasons which were never made public. Dukes recalled: "We last spoke in August and he informed me he wasn't going to Washington after all. I told him I was heartbroken to hear that. Aside from being heartbroken, I am puzzled. Twin Peaks is not Twin Peaks without Michael Ontkean as Sheriff Harry S. Truman."

Ontkean's role was replaced by Robert Forster, playing Sheriff Truman's brother Frank. Forster was initially David Lynch's first choice to play Harry Truman in 1990.

Personal life
Michael was married to Jamie Smith-Jackson, an actress and design director and owner of Jamie Jackson Design. The couple later divorced; they have two daughters, Jenna Millman and Sadie Sapphire Ontkean.

Filmography

Film

Television

Awards and nominations

References

External links

1946 births
Living people
Canadian Roman Catholics
Canadian male film actors
Canadian male television actors
Male actors from Vancouver
University of New Hampshire alumni
New Hampshire Wildcats men's ice hockey players
20th-century Canadian male actors
21st-century Canadian male actors
Canadian expatriate male actors in the United States